We Won't Kill Each Other with Guns is a 2022 Spanish comedy-drama film directed by Maria Ripoll which stars Lorena López, Carlos Troya, Elena Martín, Joe Manjón, and Ingrid García-Jonsson.

Plot 
Upon initiative from Blanca, a group of five friends in their 30s (completed by Miguel, Sigfrido, Elena, and Marina) meet again in town after years of not seeing each other.

Cast

Production 
Penned by Víctor Sánchez and Antonio Escámez, the screenplay adapts Sánchez's play Nosotros no nos mataremos con pistolas. It features dialogue in Catalan and Spanish.

Release 
The film made its world premiere at the 25th Málaga Film Festival on 24 March 2022. It also screened at the 6th BCN Film Fest in April 2022 for its Catalonia premiere. Distributed by Filmax, it was theatrically released in Spain on 17 June 2022.

Reception 
Júlia Olmo of Cineuropa pointed out that "on paper, the premise would appear interesting, as the starting point has great potential" but "the big problem with the film is that none of this goes beyond mere intentions" and the film gets "bogged down in platitudes, clichés and naivety – even triviality".

Elsa Fernández-Santos of El País, pointed that the film's flashes place it among the best of Ripoll's filmography while lamenting that final party's [poor] climax with "that beer commercial look", even though Ripoll gets it right with the tragicomic tone.

Beatriz Martínez of El Periódico de España rated the film 2 out of 5 stars, pointing out that "everything is too shallow" and the clichés "are difficult to overcome, although at least they are defended by a stupendous group of actors".

Sergio F. Pinilla of Cinemanía rated the film 3½ ouf ot 5 stars, determining that it "cunningly combines the nostalgic element, comedy and emotional thriller".

Raquel Hernández Luján of HobbyConsolas rated the film with 52 points ("so-so"), praising how it manages to portray "the disenchantment of an entire generation" and their structural problems, while negatively pointing out how "it does not delve into anything, it is impossible to empathize with the characters" and the viewing becomes a struggle.

Accolades 

|-
| rowspan = "2" align = "center" | 2023 || rowspan = "2" | 15th Gaudí Awards || colspan = "2" | Best Film ||  || rowspan = "2" | 
|-
| Best Adapted Screenplay || Víctor Sánchez Rodríguez, Antonio Escámez Osuna || 
|}

See also 
 List of Spanish films of 2022

References

References 

Spanish comedy-drama films
2022 comedy-drama films
2020s Spanish films
2020s Catalan-language films
2020s Spanish-language films
Films shot in the province of Valencia
Spanish films based on plays